The Scottish Rugby Academy provides Scotland's up and coming rugby stars a dedicated focused routeway for development into the professional game. Entry is restricted to Scottish qualified students and both male and female entrants are accepted into 4 regional academies. The 2021–22 season sees the seventh year of the academy, now sponsored by Fosroc.

Season overview

This was the seventh year of the Scottish Rugby Academy.

Regional Academies

The Scottish Rugby Academy runs four regional academies in Scotland:- Glasgow and the West, Borders and East Lothian, Edinburgh and Caledonia. These roughly correspond to the traditional districts of Glasgow District, South, Edinburgh District and North and Midlands.

Stages

Players are selected in three stages:-

Supported stages

Stage 1 - Regionally selected and regionally supported players
Stage 2 - Nationally selected and regionally supported players

Contracted stage

Stage 3 - Nationally selected and regionally supported players assigned to a professional team.

Academy Players

Stage 3 players

Stage 3 players are assigned to a professional team. Nominally, for the men, Glasgow Warriors receive the Stage 3 players of Glasgow and the West and Caledonia regions, while Edinburgh Rugby receive the Stage 3 players of the Edinburgh and Borders and East Lothian regions. The women are integrated into the Scotland women's national rugby sevens team and the Scotland women's national rugby union team.

The Stage 3 players were assigned directly to Glasgow Warriors and Edinburgh Rugby.

However they were also assigned to the Super 6 sides when not in use by the United Rugby Championship sides.

Glasgow Warriors

Edinburgh

Super 6 intake

Ayrshire Bulls

Boroughmuir Bears

Heriots Rugby

Southern Knights

Stirling County

Watsonians

Supported players

The inductees for the 2021–22 season are split into their regional academies. The male players are still in Stage 1 and Stage 2 of the academy and not yet deemed professional players. The women named, however, may be international players, using the academy for support. Stage 1 and Stage 2 players have yet to be announced for the 2021–22 season.

Graduates of this year 

None as yet.

References

2021-22
2021–22 in Scottish rugby union